Temitayo Ibitoye better known as Tee-Y Mix is known not just for mixing but also producing, he has produced for Iyanya, Seyi Shay, Chidinma, Darey and more.

Growing up and education
Tee-Y Mix is a native of Oyo State and was born and raised there. He is an alumna of the University of Abuja where he graduated with a degree in Computer science. He got his diploma in Audio Recording Engineering from the Audio Institute of America

Career
On 14 January 2022, he released his first official single "Closer". The song features guest vocals from Oxlade and Moelogo.

Project Fame West Africa
In 2008, Tee-Y Mix appeared as one of three judges for the reality television music competition show Project Fame West Africa. Tee-Y Mix, along with fellow judges Adé Bantu and Bibie Brew, evaluated thousands of amateur contestants in their ability to sing. Tee-Y Mix won praise as a sympathetic and compassionate judge. In 2020, he was also a judge on the pilot season of Access the stars music TV reality show.

Vivace Records
In 2014 Tee-Y Mix launched his record label Vivace Records.
Artist signed to Vivace Records.

Production discography

Singles produced

Singles Mixed

Movie Soundtracks
Sound Track(s) Produced By Tee-Y Mix

Accolades

See also
List of Nigerian musicians

References

External links
 Dare Art Alade ft. 2Face – Carry Go (Prod. By Tee-Y Mix) www.vibesxclusive.com. Retrieved 24 April 2008

Living people
Hip hop record producers
Nigerian hip hop record producers
Nigerian audio engineers
People from Oyo State
Year of birth missing (living people)